Medford is a community in the Canadian province of Nova Scotia, located in  Kings County. It lies north of Kingsport, Nova Scotia on the Minas Basin.

External links
 Medford on Destination Nova Scotia
History of Medford

Communities in Kings County, Nova Scotia